They Call Me Cemetery (also known as His Pistols Smoked... They Call Him Cemetery and A Bullet for a Stranger) is a 1971 Italian Spaghetti Western film directed by Giuliano Carnimeo and starring Gianni Garko.

Plot
Two brothers find themselves in serious trouble when they arrive in a small western town to visit their father and run afoul of the local gang. This lawless land offers no hope for our well-intentioned but hopeless outnumbered duo. A mysterious stranger's arrival may prove to be beneficial for the good-natured brothers and their facing off against the ruthless gang.

Cast 

  Gianni Garko as  Cemetery
 William Berger as  Duke
 Chris Chittell as  John McIntire
 John Fordyce as George McIntire
 Ugo Fangareggi as  Sancho
 Raimondo Penne as  Chico
 Franco Ressel as The Judge
  Aldo Barberito as  Toland
 Ivano Staccioli as  Avelin 
 Nello Pazzafini as Cobra Ramirez 
 Ugo Adinolfi as Breeder  
 Bill Vanders as Clay McIntire 
 Federico Boido as Ambusher
 Pinuccio Ardia as Gunsmith

References

External links

They Call Him Cemetery at Variety Distribution

Spaghetti Western films
1971 Western (genre) films
1971 films
Films directed by Giuliano Carnimeo
1970s Italian-language films
1970s Italian films